Juliette Boulet, born in Namur, 14 January 1981 is a Belgian politician, a member of Ecolo.

References

External links
Personal blog

1981 births
People from Namur (city)
Ecolo politicians
Living people
21st-century Belgian politicians
21st-century Belgian women politicians